Aamar Durga is an Indian Bengali television soap opera that premiered on 18 January 2016 on ZEE5 and Zee Bangla. Produced by Acropolis Entertainment Pvt. Ltd., it starred Sanghamitra Talukdar and Hritojeet Chattopadhyay in lead roles.

The show, set amidst a background of political corruption, has been cited as an example of increasingly diverse roles played by female characters in Bengali programming. The show was discontinued on 21 October 2017.

Cast

Main
 Sanghamitra Talukdar as Durga Mukherjee (née Chakraborty)- a brave girl who protests against the corrupt practices of politician Abhirup Mukherjee, Ani's wife. Later, she was elected as Chief Minister.
 Sanchari Das as Charulata Mukherjee (née Chakraborty) / Charu / Mili- Durga's elder sister, Mihir's wife
 Hritojeet Chatterjee as Anirban Mukherjee / Ani- Abhiroop's youngest son, Durga's love interest and husband
 Dhrubajyoti Sarkar as Mihir Mukherjee- Abhiroop's eldest son, Charu's love interest and husband, Durga's brother-in-law

Recurring
 Sumanta Mukhopadhyay as Abhirup Mukherjee: Mihir and Riya's father; Ani's foster father a corrupt minister. 
 Nandini Chatterjee as Mandira Mukherjee: Abhirup's wife, Mihir and Riya's mother;Ani's foster mother
 Arindam Banerjee as Ishwar Chakraborty: Charu and Durga's father. 
 Maitryee Mitra as Pratima Chakraborty: Charu and Durga's mother
 Suchismita Chowdhury as Bela: Puja's mother
 Saibal Bhattacharya / Sohon Bandopadhyay as Bijoy Mukherjee: Abhirup's younger brother, Bela's husband;Puja's father
 Piyali Basu as Sucheta: a school teacher
 Ratan Sarkhel as Brojeshwar / Brojo: Ani's biological father, Abhirup's friend
 Kushal Chakraborty as Sujoy Mukherjee: Neha and Mimi's father
 Sahana Sen as Shipra: Neha and Mimi's mother
 Manishankar Banerjee as Captain 
 Juiee Sarkar as Riya 
 Jagriti Goswami as Puja 
 Ishani Das as Neha
 Oindrila Saha as Mimi
 Deerghoi Paul as Gunjan Sen
 Runa Bandopadhyay as Deepa  
 Indrajit Mazumder as Shubhomoy Bose / Shubho: Riya's love interest 
 Subhrajit Dutta as Samrat: Riya's husband
 Bikash Bhowmik as Bhabani: Samrat's father
 Judhajit Banerjee as Susheel Sen: Gunjan's father, Abhirup's friend.
 Kuyasha Biswas as Dalia: Charu / Durga's Friend
 Raj Bhattacharya as Dr. Anjan Sen
 Sanchari Mondal as Torsha Mitra
 Shriti Singh as Uma / Durga Governess
 Arpita Mukherjee as Bilkis: a prisoner
 Mallika Majumder as Swatilekha: Durga's coach
 Anindita Sarkar as Aradhya Sen
 Biresh Chakraborty as Pradesh Lahiri: a police officer, killed by Abhirup.
 Atonu Saha as Prem Majumder

Adaptations

References

External links 
 Aamar Durga at ZEE5

2016 Indian television series debuts
2017 Indian television series endings
Zee Bangla original programming
Bengali-language television programming in India